Tokyo Live is a live jazz album released by The Free Spirits (guitarist John McLaughlin, organist Joey DeFrancesco and drummer Dennis Chambers) on Verve in 1994. Despite the group credit on the sleeve, the record is generally considered to be a McLaughlin solo album.

The album was produced by John McLaughlin; the executive producer was Jean-Philippe Allard. It was recorded live on December 16 and 18, 1993 at the Blue Note Tokyo jazz club in Tokyo, Japan.

Track listing
(All pieces composed by John McLaughlin except "No Blues" by Miles Davis)

"1 Nite Stand" 7:05
"Hijacked" 10:25
"When Love is Far Away" 4:56
"Little Miss Valley" 10:56
"Juju at the Crossroads" 5:15
"Vukovar" 12:11
"No Blues" 4:27
"Mattinale" 19:42

Personnel
John McLaughlin - guitar
Joey DeFrancesco - Hammond XB-3 organ, trumpet
Dennis Chambers - drums

Charts

References

John McLaughlin (musician) live albums
1993 live albums
Verve Records live albums